Józef Światło, born Izaak Fleischfarb (1 January 1915 – 2 September 1994), was a high-ranking official in the Ministry of Public Security of Poland (UB) who served as deputy director of the 10th Department run by Anatol Fejgin. Known for supervising the torture of political prisoners, he was nicknamed "the Butcher" by the detainees.

After the 1953 death of Joseph Stalin and arrest of Lavrentiy Beria, Światło traveled to East Germany on official business. While on the Berlin subway with Fejgin, passing through West Berlin, on 5 December 1953, he "slipped away" and defected to the West.

Afterwards he worked for the American Central Intelligence Agency and Radio Free Europe. Światło's written and broadcast denunciations shook the Polish United Workers' Party. This ultimately contributed to post-Stalinist reforms of the Polish security apparatus and to Poland's political liberalisation in the socialist Polish October revolution.

Biography
Józef Światło was born on 1 January 1915 as Izaak Fleischfarb (also Fleichfarb, Licht, or Lichtstein, sources vary), into a Jewish family in Medyn village near Zbarazh in Galicia (now Ukraine). In the Second Polish Republic he was first a Zionist and later, a communist activist. He was arrested twice for his illegal activities. Conscripted in 1939, he served in the Polish Army (Polish 6th Infantry Division) during the German invasion that year. Taken prisoner by the Germans, he escaped, only to be taken prisoner by the Red Army, which invaded Eastern Poland where his family lived and deported east along with hundred thousands of others. It was also in that period that, on 26 April 1943, he married Justyna Światło, taking her more Polish-sounding surname. Światło eventually joined the Polish Forces in the East (Polish 1st Tadeusz Kościuszko Infantry Division, Berling's Army), becoming a political officer; he was also promoted to junior lieutenant (podporucznik) and became involved in organising state administration in areas taken from the Germans.

In 1945, he was transferred to the newly formed Ministry of Public Security of Poland (officially MBP, but commonly abbreviated to UB). In his work, Światło, like many other communist secret police agents, used torture and forgery. He was involved in arresting hundreds of members of Polish underground organization, Armia Krajowa, its leadership (the Trial of the Sixteen) and falsifying of the 1946 Polish referendum. In time he was promoted to Lieutenant colonel (pol.Podpułkownik) and served in various offices and departments, eventually in 1951 ending up in the 10th Department, where he was one of the leading officers. The 10th Department was responsible for handling the Party members themselves. He received orders personally from the First Secretary of the Polish United Workers' Party Bolesław Bierut, and arrested such notable people as politicians Władysław Gomułka and Marian Spychalski, General Michał Rola-Żymierski and Cardinal Stefan Wyszyński. He had access - sometimes unique - to many secret documents. He interrogated Noel Field on 27 August 1949 in Budapest as well as his brother, Herman Field (a US citizen who went to Poland to look for his brother). Herman would be secretly imprisoned for five years, until the information on him was revealed - by Światło himself.

Defection to the West
In November 1953, the First Secretary of the Polish United Workers' Party Bolesław Bierut asked Politburo member Jakub Berman to send UB Lieutenant Colonel Józef Światło on an important mission to East Berlin. Światło, deputy head of UB's Department X, together with Colonel Anatol Fejgin, were asked to consult with Stasi chief Erich Mielke about eliminating Wanda Brońska. Światło, however, after the death of Stalin in March 1953 and arrest of Lavrentiy Beria in June that year, became afraid for his own life. He suspected that Bierut in Poland might turn on him and other members of the Ministry, attempting to make them into scapegoats.

The two officers traveled to Berlin and spoke with Mielke. On 5 December 1953, the day after meeting the Stasi chief, Światło defected to the U.S. military mission in West Berlin. He left family - wife and two children - in Poland. The next day, American military authorities transported Światło to Frankfurt and by Christmas Światło had been flown to Washington, D.C., where he underwent an extensive debriefing. It has been reported that his interrogations were compiled into about fifty long reports. The United States gave him political asylum with the full knowledge that "he would have to be protected for the rest of his life because the number of his victims and relatives of victims sworn to exact retribution was so great."

Aftermath
Światło's defection was revealed in Poland by the Polish Press Agency on 25 October 1954, with Światło labelled a traitor and provocateur. It was, however, widely publicised in the United States and Europe by the US authorities, as well as in Poland via Radio Free Europe, embarrassing the Communist authorities in Warsaw - the first international press conference with Światło took place on 28 September 1954. Światło had intimate knowledge of the internal politics of the Polish government, especially the activities of the various secret services. Over the course of the following months, US newspapers and Radio Free Europe (in the "Behind the scenes of the secret service and the party" cycle) reported extensively on political repression in Poland based on Światło's revelations.

Capitalising on them, in what was known as "Operation Spotlight", RFE broadcast some 140 interviews by Światło, and 30 programs on him. Światło's RFE broadcasts were not only serialized but even distributed over Poland by special balloons. Światło detailed the torture of prisoners under interrogation and politically motivated executions and struggles inside the Polish United Workers' Party.<ref> Leszek Szymowski, Brawurowa ucieczka najsłynniejszego zbiega, Onet.pl, 26 January 2010. Retrieved 6 April 2011</ref> None of the Polish Communists intelligence, counterintelligence and public security agencies escaped unscathed and without some of their secrets being revealed.

The highly publicised defection of Colonel Światło, not to mention the general hatred of the Ministry of Public Security among Poles, led to changes in late 1954, as first the 10th Department and soon afterwards, the entire Ministry, was broken up and reorganised; many officials were arrested. Światło's scandal contributed to the events of political liberalisation in Poland, known as the Polish October. 
For a long time, it was uncertain if Światło was dead or still alive. Information on him was protected by the US witness protection program; there were rumours that he died in the late 1960s, 1975 or 1985. In 2010, the United States government stated that he had died on 2 September 1994. Documents relating to him are still classified in the United States and not available to researchers.

Awards

See also
 List of Eastern Bloc defectors

Notes
a  Sources vary in giving his original surname. IPN lists it as Fleischfarb, noting that this name was used by Światło himself in some documents; this name is used most commonly in the sources. Several sources, such as Gluchowski, use an alternative spelling - Fleichfarb. Piotrowski and several other sources also list one or two other name variants, namely: Licht and Lichtstein.

References

Further reading
 Sobor-Swiderska A., "Jozef Swiatlo - Myth and Reality", Studia Historyczne (Historical Studies), year: 2006, vol: 49, number: 1(193), pages: 41–63, (abstract).
  Zbigniew Błażyński: Mówi Józef Światło. Za kulisami bezpieki i partii 1940–1955 [Józef Światło speaking. Behind the scenes of secret police and party 1940-1955]. Wydawnictwo LTW, Warszawa, 2003. 
  Roger Faligot, Remi Kauffer, Służby specjalne [Special services], ISKRY, Warszawa 1998, originally in French: Roger Faligot, Remi Kauffer, Histoire mondiale du renseignement 1870-1939 Les maitres espions. Histoire mondiale du renseignement. De la guerre froide a nos jours. Editions Robert Laffont SA, Paris 1993, 1994

1915 births
1994 deaths
People from Ternopil Oblast
People from the Kingdom of Galicia and Lodomeria
Jews from Galicia (Eastern Europe)
Austro-Hungarian Jews
Ukrainian Jews
Jewish socialists
Polish military personnel of World War II
Polish People's Army personnel
Polish intelligence officers (1943–1990)
Polish defectors
Ministry of Public Security (Poland) officials
Defectors to the United States
People sentenced to death in absentia
Knights of the Order of Polonia Restituta
Recipients of the Gold Cross of Merit (Poland)
Recipients of the Silver Cross of Merit (Poland)